The Noida–Greater Noida Expressway is a six-lane expressway connecting Noida, Uttar Pradesh, an industrial suburb of Delhi to Greater Noida, a new suburb. This expressway is under expansion to Taj Economic Zone, International Airport and Aviation Hub proposed to be constructed along the Yamuna Expressway (Taj Expressway).

Inter-connectivity

Following will either connect to or will provide an alternate route to the Noida-Greater Noida Expressway:

 Noida-Greater Noida Bundh Expressway (NGNBE): nearly 25 km long, INR 400 crore, 6-lane expressway between Yamuna river and existing Noida-Greater Noida Expressway will run over the bundh (flood prevention embankment) from Noida Sector-94 (near southeast corner of Okhla bird sanctuary) to Noida Sector-168. Near sector 94, it will start from the existing Noida-Greater Noida Expressway, then along the way near Gulavali & sector 160 will interchange with Gulavali-LG Chowk road, and end near sector 168 at Faridabad–Noida–Ghaziabad Expressway (FNG).

See also

 Eastern Peripheral Expressway
 Western Peripheral Expressway
 Highways in Haryana
 Haryana Orbital Rail Corridor (HORC)

References

Expressways in Uttar Pradesh
Transport in Noida